Beast is the second album by Vamps, released on July 28, 2010. The limited edition includes a DVD with the music videos for the songs: "Devil Side", "Angel Trip", "Revolution" and "My First Last". The album reached number 3 on the Oricon chart.

Track listing 

Disc two (DVD, limited edition only)

References 

2010 albums
Vamps (band) albums